The Passionist nuns are an order of nuns in the Roman Catholic Church. It was the second Passionist order to be established, founded by St. Paul of the Cross and a nun known as Mother Mary Crucified in 1771.

History
In the "Life of St. Paul of the Cross" by Vincent Strambi, evidence can be found of Paul's intentions from the beginning of the Congregation of the Passion to found an institute in which women, consecrated to the service of God, could devote themselves to prayer and meditation on the Passion of Jesus. However, it was not until the end of Paul's life that he wrote the rules of this institution, which were approved by the brief of Clement XIV in 1770.

Working with Paul on the foundation of the Passionist nuns was Mother Mary Crucified, whose secular name was Faustina Gertrude Constantini. She was born at Corneto, 18 August 1713. In youth, she placed herself under the direction of St. Paul of the Cross, and became a Benedictine nun in her native city, awaiting the establishment of a Passionist convent. Through the generosity of her relatives, Dominic Costantini, his brother Nicolas, and his wife Lucia, a site was obtained for the first convent of the new institute in Corneto, and a suitable house and chapel were built.

On the Feast of the Cross, 1771, Mother Mary Crucified, with the permission of Clement XIV and with ten postulants, was clothed in the habit of the Passion and entered the first convent of Passionist nuns, solemnly opened by the vicar capitular of the diocese. Paul, detained by illness, was represented by the first consultor general of the order, Father John Mary. Mother Mary Crucified became the first mother superior of her order and remained so until her death in 1787.

The spirit of the institute and its distinctive character is devotion to the Passion of Christ, to which the sisters bind themselves by vows. Sisters live austere lives, and postulants seeking admission to the strictly enclosed convents must have a dowry. The sisters chant or recite the Divine Office in common and spend the greater part of the day in prayer and other duties of piety. They attend to the domestic work of the convent, and occupy themselves in their cells with needlework, making vestments etc.

With the approbation of Pius IX a house was established at Mamers in the Diocese of Le Mans, France, in 1872, and continued to flourish until suppressed with other religious communities in 1903 by the government. There is also a Passionist convent at Lucca whose foundation was predicted by Gemma Galgani, a mystic. On 5 May 1910, five Passionist nuns from Italy arrived in Pittsburgh to found a convent in the United States.

Sources

References

External links
Passionist Nuns of Pittsburgh, Pennsylvania
Passionist Nuns of Whitesville, Kentucky
Passionist Nuns of Clarks Summit, Pennsylvania

 
Catholic female orders and societies
Passionist Order
1771 establishments in France